Sir David Cardwell, KCB (1920 – 19 June 1982) was a British civil servant and government scientist. Educated at the University of London, he entered the Royal Aircraft Establishment in 1942. He became Chief Scientist (Army) in 1976. From 1978 to 1980, he was director of the Atomic Weapons Research Establishment. From 1980 to his death in 1982, he was Chief of Defence Procurement at the Ministry of Defence.

References 

1920 births
1982 deaths
British civil servants
British scientists
Alumni of the University of London
Knights Companion of the Order of the Bath